Raffaele de Palma, O.F.M. Conv. (died 1674) was a Roman Catholic prelate who served as Bishop of Oria (1650–1674).

Biography
Raffaele de Palma was ordained a priest in the Order of Friars Minor Conventual.
On 14 February 1650, he was appointed during the papacy of Pope Innocent X as Bishop of Oria.
On 24 February 1650, he was consecrated bishop by Francesco Maria Brancaccio, Bishop of Viterbo e Tuscania. 
He served as Bishop of Oria until his death on 5 March 1674.

References 

17th-century Italian Roman Catholic bishops
Bishops appointed by Pope Innocent X
1674 deaths
Conventual Franciscan bishops